IndieFeed is a music discovery podcast, playlist and web service, founded in 2004, which offers new music from independent artists in the form of single song shows. Shows include a brief introduction, a featured music track, info about the artist and where to find more.

IndieFeed comprises six music channels: Alternative / Modern Rock, Blues, Dance, Electronica, Hip Hop and Indie-Pop. Each channel is managed by a host who delivers programming within the constraints of the genre. New and archived shows are available at no charge for download and subscription at the website and via iTunes Store. IndieFeed also offers playlists that grow throughout the month on music streaming services Spotify, Rdio and Rhapsody.

IndieFeed was named one of Apple's Best Podcasts in 2007  and 2008. In 2010, Mashable named IndieFeed one of 7 Essential Podcasts You Should Add To Your Playlist.

Founder and host Chris MacDonald is current co-founder of HugeFan, an experiential marketplace for performers.  He formerly chaired the Association for Downloadable Media, and was Executive Vice President of Business Development and Operations at Liberated Syndication, the enterprise podcast service that hosts IndieFeed, and he is a frequent speaker on matters of downloadable and new media and direct-to-fan experiences. Chris recently launched a beard care product line known as Beardashery.

Content Submission
IndieFeed receives and reviews content submitted from artists through its website. All featured content is rights cleared, meaning that the owner provides permission to publish through IndieFeed.

Hosts
IndieFeed channels are managed by a collective of curators, who host and produce shows featured on the IndieFeed network. Current hosts include:
Chris MacDonald – Founder and host of multiple IndieFeed Channels, Chris is co-founder of HugeFan, an experiential marketplace for performers, was chairman of the Association for Downloadable Media (ADM), and frequent speaker on matters of downloadable and new media, having spoken at: NAB Radio Show, South By Southwest Interactive, Dow Jones Venture Voice, Future of Music Coalition Policy Summit, Social Media and Government Conference, Corporate Podcasting Conference (London and Silicon Valley) iBreakfast NYC, American Petroleum Institute New Media Summit and VONx.
Dirt E. Dutch – Longtime host and producer of the IndieFeed HipHop Channel, Dirt E. Dutch is also a member of the underground record label Little Ax and the CT hip hop coalition Antfarm Affiliates. In addition to releasing two LPs with NYC rapper Breez Evahflowin, he has contributed to numerous artist releases, including releases for Emskee of the Good People, Phenetiks and Rising Sun Quest.
Eric Gordon – Host and producer of the IndieFeed Dance Channel, Eric is also Assistant Director Audio & Video Systems & Services at American University with BS in Audio Technology and nightclub DJ.
Wess “Mongo” Jolley – Host and producer of the IndieFeed Performance Poetry Channel, Mongo is a poet and poetry promoter.

Former hosts include:
Hieronymus Murphy – Host and producer of the IndieFeed Blues Channel and Murphy's Saloon Blues Podcast.
Jaime Ravenet – Co-host of IndieFeed's Alternative, Indie Pop, and Electronica channels.

References 

American music websites